is a railway station on the AbukumaExpress in the city of Kakuda, Miyagi Prefecture, Japan.

Lines

Station layout
Oka Station has one side platform serving a single bi-directional track. The station is unattended.

Adjacent stations

History
Oka Station opened on April 1, 1968, as a station on the Japanese National Railways (JNR). The station became a station on the Abukuma Express on July 1, 1986.

Surrounding area
 Kakuda Space Center

See also
 List of Railway Stations in Japan

External links

 

Railway stations in Miyagi Prefecture
Abukuma Express Line
Railway stations in Japan opened in 1968
Kakuda, Miyagi